Norvellina chenopodii is a species of leafhopper in the family Cicadellidae.

References

Further reading

External links

 

Athysanini
Insects described in 1923